"Local Boy" is the second single from the British indie rock band The Rifles, from their debut record No Love Lost. The single was released via Right Hook Recordings in November 2005 and reached number 36 in the UK singles chart.

Track listings

2005 singles
The Rifles (band) songs
2005 songs